Filip Moravčík (born 27 August 1991) is a Slovak football midfielder who currently plays for the Slovak Corgoň Liga club FC Nitra. He is the nephew of the former footballer Ľubomír Moravčík.

Career
Moravčík made his first Corgoň Liga appearance against FK DAC 1904 Dunajská Streda. He scored his first goal for FC Nitra in a 3–1 away loss against FK Senica.

References

External links
FC Nitra profile

Eurofotbal.cz profile

1991 births
Living people
Slovak footballers
Association football midfielders
FC Nitra players
Slovak Super Liga players
Place of birth missing (living people)